Graptasura polygrapha is a moth of the subfamily Arctiinae. It was described by Felder in 1874. It is found on Sulawesi in Indonesia.

References

Lithosiini
Moths described in 1874